The FH70 (field howitzer for the 1970s) is a towed howitzer in use with several nations.

History
In 1963, NATO agreed a NATO Basic Military Requirement 39 for close support artillery, either towed or tracked. Subsequently, Germany and UK started discussions and design studies and in 1968 established agreed operational characteristics for a towed 155 mm close support gun. Italy became a party to the agreement in 1970.

Key requirements were:
 A detachable auxiliary power unit (APU)
 A burst capability of three rounds in 15–20 seconds, six rounds per minute for a short period and two rounds per minute sustained
 The ablility to fire all 155 mm munitions in NATO service, plus a new range of ammunition.

The two national authorities had overall responsibility for R&D, and Vickers Ltd was the co-ordinating design authority. They were also the design authority for the carriage and Rheinmetall GmbH was the authority for the elevating mass, including the sights, and for the APU. There was a further breakdown at a more detailed level and production worksharing. The UK Royal Armament Research and Development Establishment (RARDE) was responsible for designing the HE projectile and the charge system. Germany was responsible for Smoke, Illuminating, Minelet and extended range HE, although the development of the last two was not completed in the programme.

The intention was for FH70 to replace the M114 155 mm howitzer and equip general support battalions in German divisional artillery regiments and to equip three British general support medium regiments replacing the 5.5-inch gun. In the event, it actually equipped UK regular regiments in direct support of infantry brigades until after the end of the Cold War, and only replaced the L118 light gun in two TA regiments, 100th (Yeomanry) Regiment Royal Artillery and 101st (Northumbrian) Regiment Royal Artillery from 1992 to 1999.

Design
FH70 features included:
 a vertical sliding-block breech that provided obturation and held a primer magazine containing 12 primers (a similar breech was fitted to German M109G)
 burst fire
 electronic firing data display taking data from the otherwise conventional azimuth and elevation sights.

The barrel was 39 calibres long, giving 827 m/s standard maximum muzzle velocity. It had a muzzle brake giving 32% efficiency.

Other conventional features included a split trail and turntable sole plate. Initially, it had assisted loading but became an early user of flick-ramming. In accordance with long-standing UK practice, it used one-man laying. All this meant that the gun could be operated by a minimum detachment of only four men (commander, layer and two loaders). The burst fire rate was three rounds in 15 seconds. It was also fitted with a direct fire telescope.

There were a number of design flaws that became apparent in service. The equipment entered full operational service in the UK in 1980. It became clear that there were significant difficulties with the tube feed system in anything but ideal conditions. 1st Regiment RHA, a unit that had conducted the Troop trials, developed their own procedures to solve these problems, related to dust contamination, and this process became established in official manuals in due course. More significantly, the trails of the gun proved to be weak at the point where maximum stress was incurred when the equipment was towed; this resulted in modification work on the UK guns in 1987. There were continual problems with the drive train on the flat-4 VW APU, and the hydraulic system was always vulnerable to the obvious problems posed by external, non-armoured, housing in combat conditions. In addition, the complex dial sight carrier was vulnerable to damage.

Ammunition

The new projectiles conformed to the Quadrilateral Ballistics Agreement between the US, UK, Germany and Italy. In essence, this meant a shell with the same shape and dimensions as the US M549 rocket-assisted projectile. The standard HE shell (UK designation L15) is a thin wall design weighing  and containing  of HE. This remains the largest HE load for a standard 155mm shell.

The propellant system comprises three different bagged cartridges with triple-base propellant.

Each nation developed its own fuzes and ammunition packaging. In the UK's case, this led to the Unit Load Container carrying 17 complete rounds, including shells with fuzes fitted - a novelty for 155 mm.

Standard US pattern 155 mm ammunition can also be fired, although US primers proved problematic for the primer magazine and feed due to their variation in size.

Operators

Current operators
  – 24 (all to be donated to Ukraine as K9 arrives)
  – 90 in service of 162 ordered
  – 480 Built under license with the ordnance by Japan Steel Works.
  – Unknown number in service.
  – 30
  – 12
  – 72
  – undisclosed number supplied by Italy and Estonia.

Former operators
  – 150 as FH155-1 (Field Howitzer 155mm Mk1). Last unit (225th Mountain Artillery Battalion) converted to tracked artillery in 2002.
  – 15 units
  – 15 in wartime reserve
  – 67 (as Howitzer 155mm L121 with Ordnance 155mm L22 on Carriage 155mm L13 in Territorial Army service until 1999).

See also
 List of weapons of the Lebanese Civil War

References

Sources
 RB Pengelley, FH70 - Europe's first multi-national artillery program, International Defense Review Vol 6, No 2 April 1973.

External links

 Italian Army Site
 Estonian Defence Forces

155 mm artillery
Field artillery
Military equipment introduced in the 1970s